In 1998 Gerhard Frey firstly proposed using trace zero varieties for cryptographic purpose. These varieties are subgroups of the divisor class group on a low genus hyperelliptic curve defined over a finite field. These groups can be used to establish asymmetric cryptography using the discrete logarithm problem as cryptographic primitive.

Trace zero varieties feature a better scalar multiplication performance than elliptic curves. This allows fast arithmetic in these groups, which can speed up the calculations with a factor 3 compared with elliptic curves and hence speed up the cryptosystem.

Another advantage is that for groups of cryptographically relevant size, the order of the group can simply be calculated using the characteristic polynomial of the Frobenius endomorphism. This is not the case, for example, in elliptic curve cryptography when the group of points of an elliptic curve over a prime field is used for cryptographic purpose.

However to represent an element of the trace zero variety more bits are needed compared with elements of elliptic or hyperelliptic curves. Another disadvantage, is the fact, that it is possible to reduce the security of the TZV of 1/6th of the bit length using cover attack.

Mathematical background 
A hyperelliptic curve C of genus g over a prime field  where q = pn (p prime) of odd characteristic is defined as

 

where f monic, deg(f) = 2g + 1 and deg(h) ≤ g. The curve has at least one -rational Weierstraßpoint.

The Jacobian variety  of C is for all finite extension  isomorphic to the ideal class group .

The characteristic polynomial of this endomorphism has the following form:

 
where ai in ℤ

With the Hasse–Weil theorem it is possible to receive the group order of any extension field  by using the complex roots τi of χ(T):

 

 

Based on this endomorphism one can reduce the Jacobian variety to a subgroup G with the property, that every element is of trace zero:

 

If the greatest common divisor  the intersection is empty and one can compute the group order of G:

 

The actual group used in cryptographic applications is a subgroup G0 of G of a large prime order l.  This group may be G itself.

There exist three different cases of cryptographical relevance for TZV:
g = 1, n = 3
g = 1, n = 5
g = 2, n = 3

Arithmetic 

The arithmetic used in the TZV group G0 based on the arithmetic for the whole group , But it is possible to use the Frobenius endomorphism σ to speed up the scalar multiplication. This can be archived if G0 is generated by D of order l then σ(D) = sD, for some integers s. For the given cases of TZV s can be computed as follows, where ai come from the characteristic polynomial of the Frobenius endomorphism :

 For g = 1, n = 3:   
 For g = 1, n = 5:   
 For g = 2, n = 3:   

Knowing this, it is possible to replace any scalar multiplication  mD (|m| ≤ l/2) with:

 

With this trick the multiple scalar product can be reduced to about 1/(n − 1)th of doublings necessary for calculating mD, if the implied constants are small enough.

Security 

For the cases where n = 3, g = 2 and n = 5, g = 1 it is possible to reduce the security for at most 6 bits, where |G| ~ 2256, because one can not be sure that G is contained in a Jacobian of a curve of genus 6. The security of curves of genus 4 for similar fields are far less secure.

Cover attack on a trace zero crypto-system 
The attack published in
shows, that the DLP in trace zero groups of genus 2 over finite fields of characteristic diverse than 2 or 3 and a field extension of degree 3 can be transformed into a DLP in a class group of degree 0 with genus of at most 6 over the base field. In this new class group the DLP can be attacked with the index calculus methods. This leads to a reduction of the bit length 1/6th.

Notes

References 
 
 

Cryptography